Péter Bacsó (6 January 1928 – 11 March 2009) was a Hungarian film director and screenwriter.

After high school graduation Bacsó wanted to become an actor and later a theatre director, but ultimately decided to try filmmaking. His first job in a film was as an assistant in Géza Radványi's Valahol Európában (Somewhere in Europe) at the age of 19. He continued as a script editor and screenwriter. He graduated at the Hungarian School of Theatrical- and Film Arts in 1950. At the time he was already a familiar face in studios.

He was a successful screenwriter during the 1950s before beginning to direct films a decade later. He made his first feature film, Nyáron egyszerű in 1963. He made his most famous film, A tanú (The Witness) in 1969, but it was banned at the time and wasn't released until 1979. The film became a cult classic in Hungary; it is a political satire about the early-1950s Communist regime.

Bacsó later continued to make mostly political and satirical films, for a wider audience. He made various genre films, trying his hand in musicals, comedies, etc. He continued filmmaking up to his later years, however his last two films were generally dismissed by critics and the public alike as badly written and low quality works. His 2001 film Hamvadó cigarettavég (Smouldering Cigarette) was a biopic of Hungarian actress and singer Katalin Karády. His 2008 film Virtually a Virgin was entered into the 30th Moscow International Film Festival.

Filmography
 The Witness (1969)
 Present Indicative (1972)
 Oh, Bloody Life (1984)
 Virtually a Virgin (2008)

References

External links

1928 births
2009 deaths
Hungarian film directors
Male screenwriters
Place of death missing
Dramaturges
20th-century Hungarian dramatists and playwrights
20th-century Hungarian male writers
Burials at Farkasréti Cemetery
Hungarian Jews
Hungarian male dramatists and playwrights
20th-century Hungarian screenwriters
Film directors from Košice